Johann Ernst Bach (28 January 1722 – 1 September 1777) was a German composer of the Classical Period. He was the son of Johann Bernhard Bach.

Life
Johann Ernst Bach, the son of Johann Bernhard Bach, was born in Eisenach and baptized on January 30, 1722. In his early life, Bach studied at the Lateinschule in Eisenach from 1732 to 1735. On January 16, 1737, he entered the Thomasschule in Leipzig, where he then became a pupil of his uncle Johann Sebastian Bach. Being a student of J.S Bach, he assisted his uncle in copying his music. During the years of 1740 to 1741, he studied law at the Universität Eisenach. He returned to Eisenach in 1741 or 1742 and filled in for his ailing father as a choirmaster and organist. In 1748, he became his father's official assistant, and in 1749 he was his successor. He continued to practice law as well. In 1756, he was appointed Hofkapellmeister "in view of his well known skill and musical knowledge". Due to the fusion of the courts, he frequently travelled between Weimar, Gotha, and Eisenach; during this time, he worked with Georg Benda on the reorganization of the Hofkapelle. When it was dissolved in 1758, after the death of Duke Ernst August, he retained his title and took over duties in the administration of the ducal finances. He died on September 1, 1777.

Style
As a composer, Johann Ernst was abreast of the stylistic innovations of his time, although he did not exclude contrapuntal writings. His works are often highly dramatic and full of effects. His songs depend on the past tradition of Görner, Gräfe, and Mizler; he often wrote galant melodies filled with lively basses and elaborate accompaniments. A picture of his perceptions of music can be deduced from the introduction he wrote to Jacob Adlung's Anleitung zu der musikalischen Gelahrtheit (1758). In it he generally criticizes the declining trend of the religious music of his time and promotes the works of Johann Sebastian Bach, Georg Philipp Telemann and Gottfried Heinrich Stelzel. His distaste for secular music can be seen through his surviving compositions, most of which are sacred. It has been widely accepted that Bach had private lessons with his uncle, which likely had an influence on his own composition.

Works

Vocal
O Seele, deren Sehnen (Passion oratorio), 1764
2 Passions, lost

Sacred cantatas
 Ach Herr, strafe mich nicht
 Alles was Odem hat
 Auf und säumt euch nicht, ihr Frommen
 Der Herr ist nahe bei denen, for the funeral of Duke Ernst August Constantin
 Der Meer ist nahe
 Die Liebe Gottes ist ausgegossen
 Ein feste Burg ist unser Gott
 Herzlich lieb hab ich dich, o Herr, on Schalling's hymn
 Kein Stündlein geht dahin
 Kommt herzu, lasset uns frohlocken
 Magnificat
 Mass on Es wolle Gott uns gnädig sein
 Mein Odem ist schwach, BWV 222, choral movements also as motet, Unser Wandel ist im Himmel, BWV Anh. 165
 Meine Seele erhebet den Herrn (i)
 Meine Seele erhebet den Herrn (ii)
 Meine Seele erhebet den Herrn (iii)
 Nach dir, Herr, verlanget mich
 Sei willkommen, mächtiger Herrscher
 Singet dem Herrn ein neues Lied
 So gehst du nun, mein Jesu, hin
 Straf mich nicht in deinem Zorn, on the hymn by Albinus
 Wenn Donnerwolken über dir sich türmen (Das Vertrauen der Christen auf Gott)
 Wünschet Jerusalem Glück
 Wie der Hirsch schreiet, lost
 Lobe den Herrn, meine Seele, lost
 several other lost cantatas (for the annual cycle 1766)

Other sacred works
Aus der Tiefen, motet, SATB
Mein Odem ist schwach, motet, SATB
Unser Wandel ist im Himmel (= bwv Anh. 165), motet, SATB
11 motets, ARk [? by C. P. E. Bach, H865]

Secular cantatas
Gesegneten Auftritt, for birthday of Duke Friedrich of Saxe-Gotha, 1756, lost
Wer sagt mir doch, was für Entzücken, lost
Sammlung auserlesener Fabeln. 
 part 1, Nuremberg, 1749
 part 2, unpublished
Lächerliche Mammonshüter (An die Geizigen), 1770

Instrumental
Sinfonia in B
Other lost sinfonias
3 Sonaten (Kbd/Vn), part 1, Eisenach, 1770
3 Sonaten (Kbd/Vn), part 2, Eisenach, 1772
Sonata in A (Fl/Vn/Bc)

Keyboard works
Sonata in G, harpsichord
Sonata in F, harpsichord
Sonata in G, harpsichord
Sonata in A, harpsichord
Fantasia and fugue in D
Fantasia and fugue in A
Fantasia and fugue in F
Chorale Valet will ich dir geben

References

Sources
H. Kühn: Vier Organisten Eisenachs aus Bachischem Geschlecht, Bach in Thüringen, 1950
C. Oefner: Die Musikerfamilie Bach in Eisenach, Eisenach, 1984 
H. Max: Verwandtes im Werk Bachs, seiner Schüler und Söhne, 1986 
E. Odrich and P. Wollny: Die Briefkonzepte des Johann Elias Bach, 2000
C. Wolff: The New Grove Bach Family, 1983

External links

 
 Sammlung auserlesener Fabeln , hrsg. v. Hermann Kretzschmar in der Reihe Denkmäler deutscher Tonkunst (I. Folge, Bd. 42), Leipzig 1910
 Passionsoratorium , edited by Joseph Kromolicki in Denkmäler deutscher Tonkunst (I. Folge, Bd. 48), Leipzig 1914
Diskografie der Werke Bachs und der Bach-Familie with several info

Johann Ernst
1722 births
1777 deaths
People from Eisenach
German Baroque composers
Organists and composers in the North German tradition
German male organists
German Classical-period composers
18th-century classical composers
18th-century German composers
18th-century German male musicians
Male classical organists